Spyridium burragorang, is a flowering shrub in the family Rhamnaceae. It has dense clusters of whitish flowers at the end of branches, alternate leaves and is endemic to New South Wales.

Description
The new growth stems are thickly covered with short, grey to yellowish star-shaped hairs intermixed with long, curved or zig-zag simple hairs. The leaves are arranged alternately, upper surface dark green, lower surface densely covered in short, soft, greyish star-shaped hairs, occasionally sparingly with more or less flattened hairs along the veins, midrib and leaf edges. The inflorescence is a terminal cluster or a loose grouping of 30-50 flowers  with 2 to 4 oval to elliptic, whitish floral leaves.

Taxonomy and naming
Spyridium burragorang was first formally described in 2004 by Kevin Thiele and the description was published in Telopea. The specific epithet (burragorang) refers to the area where it was located near Lake Burragorang.

Distribution and habitat
This spyridium is a rare species growing on dry ridges in bushland on shallow soil near Lake Burragorang, Wollondilly and near Cessnock.

References

burragorang
Rosales of Australia
Flora of New South Wales
Taxa named by Kevin Thiele